Brian Munroe is a Democratic member of the Pennsylvania House of Representatives, representing the 144th District since 2023.

Munroe attended Conestoga High School, and volunteered as a firefighter and emergency medical technician with the Berwyn Fire Company as a teenager. After attending West Chester University, he enlisted in the United States Navy at age 20 and served aboard the  during the Bosnian War. Following his military service, he served as a police officer in Radnor Township (2001–2011).

In 2012, Munroe unsuccessfully ran for the Pennsylvania House of Representatives in the 29th District, losing to Republican incumbent Bernie O'Neill. He was later elected a Warminster Township Supervisor in 2015 and Bucks County Clerk of Courts in 2019.

In 2022, Munroe successfully challenged Republican incumbent Todd Polinchock for Pennsylvania's 144th House District, defeating Polinchock by 515 votes.

External links

References 

Living people
Democratic Party members of the Pennsylvania House of Representatives
21st-century American politicians
United States Navy sailors
West Chester University alumni
Year of birth missing (living people)